L. tinctoria may refer to:
 Leea tinctoria, a plant species endemic to São Tomé and Príncipe
 Lomatia tinctoria, (Labill.) R.Br., a plant species in the genus Lomatia found in Australia

See also
 Tinctoria